11/22/63 is a novel by Stephen King about a time traveller who attempts to prevent the assassination of United States President John F. Kennedy, which occurred on November 22, 1963 (the novel's titular date). It is the 60th book published by Stephen King, his 49th novel and the 42nd under his own name. The novel was announced on King's official site on March 2, 2011. A short excerpt was released online on June 1, 2011, and another excerpt was published in the October 28, 2011, issue of Entertainment Weekly. The novel was published on November 8, 2011 and quickly became a number-one bestseller. It stayed on The New York Times Best Seller list for 16 weeks. 11/22/63 won the 2011 Los Angeles Times Book Prize for Best Mystery/Thriller and the 2012 International Thriller Writers Award for Best Novel, and was nominated for the 2012 British Fantasy Award for Best Novel and the 2012 Locus Award for Best Science Fiction Novel.

The novel required considerable research to accurately portray the late 1950s and early 1960s. King commented on the amount of research it required, saying "I've never tried to write anything like this before. It was really strange at first, like breaking in a new pair of shoes."

The novel was adapted into a Hulu television series in 2016, 11.22.63.

Background
According to King, the idea for the novel first came to him in 1971, before the release of his first novel, Carrie (1974). He was going to title it Split Track. However, he felt a historical novel required more research than he was willing to do at the time and greater literary talent than he possessed. Like his novel Under the Dome (2009), he abandoned the project, returning to the story later in life.

King first talked publicly about the idea in Marvel Spotlight issue The Dark Tower (January 27, 2007), prior to the beginning of the ongoing comic book adaptation of his Dark Tower series. In a piece in the magazine titled "An Open Letter from Stephen King", he writes about possible original ideas for comics:

Commenting on the book as historical fiction, King said: "This might be a book where we really have a chance to get an audience who's not my ordinary audience. Instead of people who read horror stories, people who read The Help or People of the Book might like this book".

King and longtime researcher Russ Dorr prepared for the novel by reading many historical documents and newspaper archives from the period, looking at clothing and appliance ads, sports scores, and television listings. The book contains detailed minutiae such as the 1958 price of a pint of root beer (10 cents) or a haircut (40 cents). King and Dorr traveled to Dallas, where they visited Oswald's apartment building (now a private residence), found the home of Gen. Edwin Walker (a target of an assassination attempt by Oswald), and had a private tour of the Sixth Floor Museum in the Texas School Book Depository. King studied various conspiracy theories, ultimately coming to the conclusion that Oswald acted alone. King met with historian Doris Kearns Goodwin, an assistant to Lyndon B. Johnson and the author of books about several presidents, and used some of her ideas of worst-case political scenarios that might occur in the absence of Kennedy's assassination.

Publication
The trade hardcover edition features a dust jacket that is a faux newspaper front page, with the front of the jacket featuring an article recounting the real historical event of Kennedy's assassination, and the back featuring an alternative history article speaking of the event as just a failed assassination attempt that Kennedy survives unscathed. The newspaper headlines were written by Stephen King. In addition to the regular trade edition, Scribner produced a signed limited edition of 1,000 copies, 850 of which were made available for sale beginning on November 8, 2011. This edition features a different dust jacket, exclusive chapter-heading photos, and a DVD. Due to a website problem on November 8, most copies remained unsold and a drawing ran from November 10 to 11 to sell the remaining copies.

There was also a limited edition of 700 published in the United Kingdom. It was a slipcased hardcover with deluxe binding, photographic endpapers, and a facsimile signature, and included a DVD.

On July 24, 2012, Gallery Books published a trade paperback edition of the novel, which contains an additional "book club kit", featuring an interview with Stephen King about 11/22/63, a set of discussion questions, and a period playlist with King's commentary and recipes.

Plot
Jake Epping is a recently divorced high school English teacher in Lisbon Falls, Maine, earning extra money teaching a GED class. Epping gives an assignment to his adult students, asking them to write about a day that changed their lives. One of the students, a learning-impaired janitor named Harry Dunning, submits an assignment describing the night his alcoholic father murdered his mother and siblings with a hammer; the story emotionally affects Jake, and the two become friends after Harry earns his GED.

Two years later, Jake is summoned by another friend, Al Templeton, the owner of a local diner. When Jake arrives at the diner, he is shocked to discover that Al has terminal lung cancer, despite appearing perfectly healthy the night before. Al instructs Jake to step into the back of the diner's pantry, where Jake finds a time slip leading to Lisbon Falls as it existed on September 9, 1958. After exploring the town, Jake returns to 2011 and learns that the portal leads to the same moment of the same day every time it is used, and that a visitor will always return to the present by a margin of two minutes.

Because the portal gives one the ability to alter the present by changing an event in the past, Al reveals that he had concocted a plan to prevent John F. Kennedy's assassination, hoping that doing so would stop the Vietnam War and change history for the better. He spent four years in the past after entering the portal the previous night, travelling to Dallas, Texas, to track Lee Harvey Oswald, plotting to kill the would-be assassin during his attempted murder of General Edwin Walker. His delay was due to the fact that he wanted to be absolutely sure that Oswald was a killer and would act alone. However, due to his cancer, Al is unable to continue his mission. He recruits a reluctant Jake to complete it.

As an experiment, Jake travels back to 1958 to save Harry's family, who will be killed by his father on Halloween night. Using the alias "George Amberson", Jake buys a car and travels to Harry's hometown of Derry, Maine, immediately disliking the place. Jake is able to find Harry's father, Frank Dunning, and track his movements. After saving all but one of Harry's siblings from Frank's brutal assault, Jake returns to 2011 hopeful that he improved Harry's life, only to learn that he indirectly caused Harry to die in Vietnam. Soon afterward, Al commits suicide.

Resigned, Jake re-enters the portal, travels back to Derry, and kills Frank while he is visiting a cemetery. After resolving one of Al's other missions—preventing a hunter from accidentally shooting a young girl—Jake makes his way, first to Florida, then to Texas to wait for Oswald's arrival. He eventually settles in Jodie, a town on the outskirts of Dallas, where he becomes a full-time English teacher at a local consolidated school. Jake has a positive effect on the students of the school, and is respected in the town. At the wedding reception of the high school's librarian Mimi Corcoran (who is retiring), Jake meets Sadie Dunhill, the new librarian. Soon after, Mimi dies. Jake and Sadie are tasked with organizing a memorial assembly, bringing them closer together. Over time, Sadie and Jake fall in love and begin a relationship. Sadie reveals that her ex-husband, John Clayton, had many odd habits owing to his obsessive compulsive disorder and was emotionally distant.

Meanwhile, Jake surveils Lee Harvey Oswald and his family, renting properties close to them and even installing microphones in their apartment. He briefly interacts with Marina Oswald. In the notebook Al gave him, Al states that George de Mohrenschildt may have been involved in the attempted assassination of Edwin Walker. After witnessing and listening to Oswald and de Mohrenschildt's interactions, Jake plans to stalk Lee on the date of the attempted assassination to see if de Mohrenschildt was present, but Clayton finds Sadie and holds her hostage. He calls Jake and threatens to kill Sadie, slashing her cheek open while Jake is on the line. Jake arrives with Deke Simmons, the former principal of the high school and Mimi's husband, and saves Sadie from being killed, but Clayton cuts his throat in front of them. Jake stays with Sadie in the hospital as she recuperates and as a result is not able to watch Lee as he attempts to kill Edwin Walker. 

As the date of the Kennedy assassination approaches, Jake gambles on a boxing match and wins, gaining the attention of local businessman Akiva Roth, who goes to Jake's house in Dallas with two associates and has them beat Jake nearly to death. As a result, Jake loses his memories of Lee Harvey Oswald and spends weeks in the hospital and in a rehabilitation center. After remembering Al's notebook, he retrieves it and forms a plan to kill Oswald in the Texas School Book Depository on the day of the assassination. He writes a letter to Sadie asking her not to try to find him for her safety. Sadie nevertheless finds him in Fort Worth and the two of them attempt to make it to Dallas in time. Along the way, they experience a bus accident and two car accidents, which Jake explains as the past trying to stop them. They arrive at the Depository just in time and Jake successfully prevents Oswald from shooting Kennedy. Secret Service members shoot Oswald dead but not before Oswald shoots Sadie in the process: she dies in Jake's arms. 

Jake is regarded as a hero and is thanked by both John F. Kennedy and Jackie Kennedy. Though the FBI does not suspect him of being involved in the assassination, one agent deduces that he was sent by someone to Texas, and tells him to leave before they can find out where he came from. Jake goes back to Lisbon Falls and is met by "The Green Card Man" (so called because he wears a green card in his hat), who tells him to go back to 2011 and see what he has done. 

Once in the future, Jake discovers that Earth has become a nuclear wasteland, and that natural disasters occur regularly. Through a conversation with Harry Dunning, he finds out that many historical tragedies such as the Jonestown incident happened with an increased death toll, and the Civil Rights Act of 1964 was never passed. The planet is on the verge of collapse, and many countries are involved in nuclear wars. Jake goes back to the past, and is told by the Green Card Man that every trip causes another "string", an alternate reality with a different past and different future. These strings overlap and eventually can cause reality to fall apart, as evidenced by what Jake saw when he returned to 2011. The Green Card Man says that he is part of a group of people who monitor time-slips, and who are often driven to insanity because of the many realities that are created when someone travels to the past. He instructs Jake to return to 2011, allowing the future to return to normal. Jake instead stays in 1958 for some time, contemplating whether to warn Sadie about John Clayton or not. 

Jake eventually returns to the future, finding that it has returned to normal. He moves out of Lisbon Falls and finds that Sadie is being celebrated as a "Citizen of the Century" in Jodie, and he goes to the party being held. Sadie, now in her eighties, spent the time between 1958 and 2011 doing charity work and served terms as mayor and in the Texas legislature, and is loved by the people of Jodie. Jake asks her to dance, and when she asks who he is, he responds "Someone you knew in another life, honey."

Alternate ending
Stephen King published an alternate ending on his official website on January 24, 2012, in which Jake finds a November 2011 news article where Sadie has turned 80. She had married a man named Trevor Anderson, with whom she has five children, eleven grandchildren, and six great-grandchildren. This ending was changed to the published version at the suggestion of King's son, writer Joe Hill.

Characters

Fictional
 Jacob "Jake" EppingAn English teacher at Lisbon Falls High School in Maine. Jake uses the alias of "George Amberson" to travel back to 1958, make his way to Texas, and track Lee Harvey Oswald's movements in the years leading up to the Kennedy assassination. Part of Jake's time is spent in Jodie, a small town on the outskirts of Dallas; there, he becomes an English teacher for a consolidated school and becomes well-liked by the students and faculty for his stage productions. Jake is eventually successful in foiling the assassination but learns that doing so has set his 21st-century world on a catastrophic path.
 Al Templeton The middle-aged proprietor of Al's Diner and long-time acquaintance of Jake. He shares the secret of his time portal, and his plan to prevent the assassination of John F. Kennedy, with Jake. His plan to do this himself has been thwarted by his cigarette smoking leading to terminal lung cancer. He motivates Jake to carry out his plan by committing suicide by overdosing on his pain medication.
 Harry DunningA janitor at Lisbon Falls High School and student in Jake's evening GED class. His submission of a paper about the night his father murdered his mother and siblings with a hammer provides Jake with motivation and a test case to see if history can be changed. In Jake's second time thread, most of his family members are saved, but Harry serves in the Vietnam War and is killed in the Tet Offensive. In Jake's third time thread, Harry survives Vietnam, and as a result, uses a wheelchair. He lives alone in a ruined Lisbon Falls.
 Frank Dunning The father of Harry Dunning. After reading Harry's essay about Frank killing his wife (Harry's mother), two of Harry's brothers and hurting Harry badly while leaving his sister in a coma, Jake sets out to murder Frank to prevent him from causing the killing to happen.
 Deacon Simmons ("Deke") The principal of Denholm Consolidated High School in Jodie, Texas, who hires "George Amberson" to teach English for a probationary year. Marries Mimi Corcoran and retires. Becomes Jake's good friend, and one of only two 1960s people in whom Jake confides his mission to save JFK.
 Mimi Corcoran Simmons ("Miz Mimi") The DCHS librarian who is Deke's girlfriend and briefly becomes his second wife, until her death from cancer. Miz Mimi takes a liking to "George" and becomes one of his good friends in the 1960s.
 Sadie Dunhill From Savannah, Georgia, replaces Miz Mimi as DCHS librarian. She has run away from her abusive and psychotic husband, Johnny; becomes Jake's lover and fiancée. She travels to Reno to get a divorce from Johnny, but he tracks her down to Jodie and holds her hostage to lure Jake. Jake frees Sadie, who is severely disfigured during the ordeal; Johnny commits suicide. Jake and Sadie reconcile, and Sadie ends up helping Jake prevent Oswald from shooting Kennedy. She is killed in the confrontation at the Texas Book Depository, but comes back to life once Jake "resets" the timeline by going through the portal. She survives Johnny's rampage without Jake's help and is still alive in April 2012.
 Ellen Dockerty ("Miz Ellie") An experienced DCHS teacher who replaces Deke Simmons as principal. Becomes a good friend of Sadie and "George" and admires the latter as a teacher, but is troubled when she discovers his teaching references are fake. She becomes angry at his refusal to tell Sadie what he is up to, but remains Jake's ally when he and Sadie are injured.

Historical
 Lee Harvey OswaldA former expatriate to the Soviet Union, living in a series of squalid residences in the Dallas-Fort Worth area with his wife and child. Oswald, who is vocal about his support for Communist causes, is depicted as an ill-tempered loner who acts out of a self-absorbed desire for fame.
 Marina Nikolayevna Prusakova A Soviet immigrant and Oswald's wife. Marina is depicted as being a victim of her husband's physical and verbal abuse, as well as the abuse of Oswald's domineering mother, Marguerite. She is depicted as an sexually attractive woman.
 George de Mohrenschildt A Soviet expatriate who becomes a friend of Oswald's, inciting the would-be assassin with hyperbolic political rhetoric. Jake eventually realizes, however, that de Mohrenschildt is an apolitical eccentric who merely finds Oswald "amusing". Jake poses as a government agent and threatens de Mohrenschildt into ending his association with Oswald.
 James Patrick Hosty An FBI agent who interrogates Jake following the assassination attempt. Hosty eventually allows Jake to leave Dallas, mostly out of a desire to avoid responsibility for his previous failure to properly investigate Oswald.
 Malcolm Oliver Perry A doctor who treats Jake after his beating. In real life, Perry treated President Kennedy as well as Oswald.
Other historical characters depicted in the book include President John F. Kennedy and First Lady Jacqueline Kennedy, who offer their gratitude to Jake during telephone calls following the assassination attempt. In the alternative timeline after the failed assassination, Kennedy is re-elected in 1964 and dies in 1983. George Wallace, Curtis LeMay and Hubert Humphrey occupy the Oval Office after Kennedy finishes his second term; Ronald Reagan defeats Humphrey in the 1976 election. Hillary Clinton is president when Jake discovers the dystopia of 2011. Legendary Texas musician Doug Sahm is portrayed as a young man playing with his band at the wedding reception for Deke and Mimi in 1961. Police Officer J.D. Tippit is shown in Jake's hospital room after his attack, helping investigate. Tippit was killed by Oswald following the assassination of Kennedy in the real world.

Critical reception
The reviews for 11/22/63 were generally positive, with The New York Times selecting the novel as one of its top five fiction books of the year and the Las Vegas Review-Journal calling it King's "best novel in more than a decade". The review aggregate site Metacritic judged 30 out of 36 reviews as positive, with four mixed and two negative. Book Marks reported 46% of critics gave the book a "rave" review, while 31% and 8% expressed "positive" and "mixed" impressions. As of 2022, on social cataloging website Goodreads the book had a score of 4.32/5 from 489,287 ratings.

NPR book critic Alan Cheuse found no fault with the structure, commenting: "I wouldn't have [King] change a single page." USA Today gave the novel four out of four stars, noting the novel retains the suspenseful tension of King's earlier works but is not of the same genre. "[The novel] is not typical Stephen King." Janet Maslin of The New York Times also commented on the genre change and pacing but felt the writer has built the narrative tightly enough for the reader to suspend disbelief. "The pages of '11/22/63' fly by, filled with immediacy, pathos and suspense. It takes great brazenness to go anywhere near this subject matter. But it takes great skill to make this story even remotely credible. Mr. King makes it all look easy, which is surely his book's fanciest trick." The review in the Houston Chronicle called the novel "one of King's best books in a long time" but "overlong", noting: "As is usually the case with King's longer books, there's a lot of self-indulgent fat in 11/22/63 that could have been trimmed." The review in the Bangor Daily News commented that the novel "[is] another winner", but provided no critical review of the plot construction. Lev Grossman, in reviewing the novel for Time, called the novel "the work of a master craftsman" but commented that "the wires go slack from time to time" and the book wanders from genre to genre, particularly in the middle. More pointedly, Los Angeles Times book critic David Ulin called the novel "a misguided effort in story and writing"; Ulin's primary criticism is the conceit of the story, which requires the reader to follow two plotlines simultaneously – historical fiction built upon the Kennedy assassination as well as the tale of a time traveling English teacher – which adds a page load to the novel that Ulin found excessive.

Awards and honors
 2011 Los Angeles Times Book Prize (Mystery/Thriller)
 2011 Goodreads Choice Award (Best Science Fiction)

Adaptation

On September 22, 2014, it was announced that a TV series based on the novel was picked up by Hulu. James Franco was chosen to star as the character of Jake Epping. The series premiered on Presidents' Day, February 15, 2016, and was met with mostly positive reviews.

See also

 John F. Kennedy assassination in popular culture
 "Profile in Silver": The Twilight Zone episode with similar plot.
 Timescape (1980) novel by Gregory Benford

References

External links

 A Stephen King Thriller: What Motivated Oswald?: Stephen King's letter to the editor regarding the politics and motivations of Lee Harvey Oswald, published on December 1, 2011, in The New York Times

2011 American novels
2011 science fiction novels
American alternate history novels
American political novels
American science fiction novels
Novels about the assassination of John F. Kennedy
Novels by Stephen King
Novels set in the 1950s
Novels set in the 1960s
Novels set in the 2010s
Novels about time travel
Fiction set in 1958
Fiction set in 1963
Fiction set in 2011
Novels set in Dallas
Novels set in Maine
American novels adapted into television shows
Cultural depictions of John F. Kennedy
Cultural depictions of Lee Harvey Oswald
Charles Scribner's Sons books